Joachim Kiteau (born 23 June 1982) is a French male javelin thrower, who won an individual gold medal at the Youth World Championships.

References

External links

1982 births
Living people
French male javelin throwers